Diluvium is the fifth studio album by German technical death metal band Obscura, released on 13 July 2018 via Relapse. Diluvium is also marked as the last album of the band's four-album concept series, along with Cosmogenesis (2009), Omnivium (2011) and Akróasis (2016).

Track listing

Personnel
Obscura
 Steffen Kummerer – vocals, guitars
 Rafael Trujillo – guitars, string arrangements 
 Linus Klausenitzer – bass
 Sebastian Lanser – drums

Additional musician
 Jonas Baumgartl – cello 
 Ulf Klausenitzer – violin 
 V. Santura – string arrangements 

Production and design
 V. Santura – production, engineering, mixing, mastering
 Obscura – production, music arrangement
 Norwin Palme – engineering assistant 
 Orion Landau – artwork
 Christian Weiss – photography
 Sylvia Makris – photography

Charts

References

2018 albums
Obscura (band) albums
Relapse Records albums